Mosha Michael ( – November 17, 2009) was sometimes called Canada's first Inuk film maker. He made three short films for the National Film Board in the 1970s: Natsik Hunting, The Hunters (Asivaqtiin) and Whale Hunting (Qilaluganiatut).

Michael grew up in Iqaluit. Diagnosed with tuberculosis as a child, he was sent to a clinic in Hamilton for a year for treatment. He also had to attend a residential school in Churchill. Later in life, Michael became homeless, due to a long-term problem with alcoholism. He died from internal bleeding a week after surgery at St. Michael Hospital. His sister Naulaq blamed decades of alcohol abuse for his death.

References

External links

1948 births
2009 deaths
Film directors from Nunavut
Inuit from the Northwest Territories
Inuit filmmakers
National Film Board of Canada people
Street people
Alcohol-related deaths in Canada
People from Iqaluit
Canadian documentary film directors
Inuit from Nunavut